Chirocephalidae is a family of fairy shrimp, characterised by a reduced or vestigial maxilla, more than two setae on the fifth endite, divided pre-epipodites and widely separated seminal vesicles. It consists of the following eight genera, including the genera formerly placed in the families Linderiellidae and Polyartemiidae:

Artemiopsis G. O. Sars, 1897
Branchinectella Daday de Dées, 1910
Chirocephalus Prévost, 1820
Dexteria Brtek, 1965
Eubranchipus Verrill, 1870
Linderiella Brtek, 1964
Polyartemia Fischer, 1851
Polyartemiella Daday de Dées, 1909

References

Anostraca
Crustacean families